William Perkins (born 23 March 1934) is a New Zealand cricketer. He played in six first-class matches for Wellington from 1952 to 1954.

See also
 List of Wellington representative cricketers

References

External links
 

1934 births
Living people
New Zealand cricketers
Wellington cricketers
Cricketers from Wellington City